Leodolter is an Austrian surname. Notable people with the surname include:

Alois Leodolter (born 1931), Austrian skier
Ingrid Leodolter (1919–1986), Austrian physician and Minister of Public Health and Environmental Protection
Otto Leodolter (1936–2020), Austrian ski jumper

German-language surnames